The Holy Towel is a tempera painting completed by Emmanuel Tzanes.  He was a representative of the Late Cretan School and the Heptanese School.  His one brother was famous painter and poet Marinos Tzanes.  His other brother was famous painter Konstantinos Tzanes.  One hundred thirty works of art are attributed to Emmanuel.  He is one of the most important Greek painters of the 17th century along with Theodoros Poulakis.  He was from Rethymno Crete.  He was active from 1625 to 1690.  He painted for over sixty-five years.  He was the priest of San Giorgio dei Greci in Venice for thirty years.

Since the inception of Christianity holy relics became an important part of the religion.  Many different objects related to the story of Jesus's life were sought after by adherents of the faith. The Holy Grail, Spear of Destiny and the Holy Shroud are some of the important relics.  Painters began to adopt the different objects into their works. Innumerable Greek-Italian Byzantine works of art featured the Holy Towel or Veil of Veronica.  El Greco completed several notable versions.  The subject was very common in the Cretan School. Angelos Pitzamanos and Theophanes the Cretan also incorporated the subject matter into their works.  A notable version was completed by Tzanes.   

The Holy Towel was finished in 1659.  The painter was in Venice when he painted the magnificent work of art.  He used the prototype of the traditional tallit to reflect his advanced knowledge of Christ's ethnic background and customs.  One year after the work was finished he became the priest of San Giorgio dei Greci. It is difficult to categorize some works of art due to the mixture of ideas and concepts. Some works belonging to the Heptanese School were ahead of their time.  Artists frequently experimented and sometimes failed to attract patrons.   Luckily, Tzanes was able to complete a successful visual work that was foreign to the standards of the day.  According to modern standards, the work would fall under pop art.  The painting is part of the collection of the Benaki Museum in Athens, Greece.  It was donated by Stefanos Vallianos.

Description
The work of art was created using wood panel, tempera paint, and gold leaf.  The work was completed in 1659. The height is 47.5 cm (18.7 in) and the width is 46 cm (18.1 in).  The masterpiece reflects the significance of the ostentatious grandiose heavenly gold background prevalent in Italian-Greek Byzantine artwork.  Italian art left behind the gold background for the realistic paintings of the Renaissance.  Greek painters continued to employ the style merging it with Renaissance art.  Tzanes created a work ahead of its time.  The face of the Christian Messiah relays a divine gaze to his viewers.  The flesh tone is painted with superlative detail.  The artist humanized Christ.  The lines of his skin are clearly visible.  The waves of his hair clearly establish contours and grooves. The color of his hair is a mixture of red, gold, and brown.  His eyes are blue.  The gold halo enhanced the gold background creating a magnificent work of art reflecting the opulence of gold and the elevated worth of the savior.  The towel is reminiscent of the traditional Hebrew tallit.  The garment is worn as a prayer shawl by religious Jews and Samaritans.  The burial shroud reflects special twined and knotted fringes known as tzitzit attached to its corners.  There are several Greek inscriptions.  The artist signed and dated the work in the left-hand corner.

Gallery

References

Bibliography 

17th-century paintings
Paintings in Greece
Paintings of the Heptanese School
Paintings by Emmanuel Tzanes